Eberl is a German surname.  Notable people with the surname include:

Anton Eberl (1765–1807), Austrian composer, teacher and pianist
Elisabeth Eberl (born 1988), Austrian javelin thrower
François Zdenek Eberl (1887–1962), Czech-born painter
Irmfried Eberl (1910–1948), Austrian SS officer and commandant of Treblinka extermination camp
Lucas Elliot Eberl (born 1986), American actor and director
Max Eberl (born 1973), German footballer
Roswitha Eberl, East German sprint canoer
Ulrich Eberl (born 1962), German science and technology journalist
Hans Christian Eberl, (born 1965) Austria International Chess Player 
Elisa Eberl, (born 2003) Austria Ski Athlete

See also
Eberle (disambiguation)

German-language surnames
Surnames from given names